Zaeera is a genus of longhorn beetles of the subfamily Lamiinae, containing the following species:

 Zaeera cretata Pascoe, 1865
 Zaeera detzneri Kriesche, 1923
 Zaeera ocellata Breuning, 1938
 Zaeera pulcherrima Nonfried, 1894

References

Pteropliini